Régis Tranquille (born 17 January 1955) is a Seychellois sprinter. He competed in the men's 400 metres at the 1980 Summer Olympics.

References

1955 births
Living people
Athletes (track and field) at the 1980 Summer Olympics
Seychellois male sprinters
Olympic athletes of Seychelles
Place of birth missing (living people)